The Meratus blue flycatcher (Cyornis kadayangensis) is a species of Old World flycatcher closely related to the Dayak blue flycatcher (Cyornis montanus). The species is confined to the Meratus Mountains of Borneo, Indonesia, which are surrounded by degraded secondary woodland or converted land space.

The species has a lighter blue color than the Dayak blue flycatcher on the upperparts and more whitish and with less red on the underparts. The species is confined to the Meratus Mountains of Borneo, Indonesia, which are surrounded by degraded secondary woodland.
The species is monotypic: no subspecies are recognised.

References

Cyornis
Endemic birds of Borneo
Birds described in 2021